Veratrum insolitum is a species of false hellebore, a type of plant closely related to the lily. Its common name is Siskiyou false hellebore. It is native to the northwestern United States: Washington (Klickitat County), western Oregon, and northwestern California as far south as Trinity County.

Veratrum insolitum is a stout, hollow-stemmed perennial growing from a thick rhizome in the clay soil of wet evergreen forests. The erect cornstalk-shaped plant bears several large green elliptical leaves decreasing in size higher up on the grayish stem. The large panicle inflorescence is packed with many off-white hairy flowers each just under a centimeter wide. There are six fringed tepals and six stout stamens, each with a club-shaped yellow anther. The fruit is a capsule 2 to 3 centimeters long which contains large winged seeds.

References

External links
Jepson Manual Treatment
Calphotos Photo gallery, University of California
Lady Bird Johnson Wildflower Center, University of Texas, Veratrum insolitum Jeps. Siskiyou false hellebore
Pacific Bulb Society, Veratrum photos of several species

insolitum
Flora of the West Coast of the United States
Plants described in 1921
Flora without expected TNC conservation status